Raoul Barrière (3 March 1928, in Béziers – 8 March 2019) was a French rugby union player and a coach. He played as a prop.

Early life 
He played for Aurillac and AS Béziers. He won the title of French Champion with AS Béziers, in 1961, and was runners-up, in 1960 and 1962. In 1968 Barrière became the coach of AS Béziers. He won to win six titles of French Champion, for 1971, 1972, 1974, 1975, 1977 and 1978.

He moved to RC Narbonne in 1980.

Honours 
 French rugby champion, 1960 with AS Béziers (player)
 French rugby champion, 1971, 1972, 1974, 1975, 1977 and 1978 with AS Béziers (Head Coach)
 Challenge Yves du Manoir 1972, 1975 and 1977 with AS Béziers and 1984 with RC Narbonne (Head Coach)
 French championship finalist 1976 with AS Béziers (Head Coach)

External links 

 Raoul Barriere

1928 births
French rugby union players
France international rugby union players
Sportspeople from Béziers
2019 deaths
Rugby union props
AS Béziers Hérault players
Stade Aurillacois Cantal Auvergne players
French rugby union coaches